Wu Zhongru (9 September 1939 – 5 February 2023) was a Chinese engineer specializing in hydraulic structure, and an academician of the Chinese Academy of Engineering.

Wu was a member of the 10th National Committee of the Chinese People's Political Consultative Conference.

Biography
Wu was born in Yixing County (now Yixing), Jiangsu, on 9 September 1939, while his ancestral home is in Shaoxing, Zhejiang. He attended Yixing Heqiao High School.

After graduating from East China Water Conservancy Institute (now Hohai University) in 1963, he worked at the Hydrology Institute of Water Resources, and then successively worked at North Henan Test Station, Tieshanhe Reservoir, Xinxiang Prefectural Electricity Bureau, and Xuzhou Power Plant Project Construction Headquarters. He joined the faculty of Hohai University in January 1979. He joined the Chinese Communist Party (CCP) in July 1986.

Wu died on 5 February 2023, at the age of 83.

Honours and awards
 1990 State Science and Technology Progress Award (Third Class) for the research and application of mathematical model for deformation observation of concrete dam
 1995 State Science and Technology Progress Award (Second Class) for the high dam safety monitoring technology and feedback
 1997 Member of the Chinese Academy of Engineering (CAE)
 2004 State Science and Technology Progress Award (Second Class) for the theory and method of dam and dam foundation safety monitoring and its application
 2007 State Science and Technology Progress Award (Second Class) for the study on monitoring and health diagnosis of hidden danger of major hydraulic concrete structures

References

1939 births
2023 deaths
People from Yixing
Engineers from Jiangsu
Hohai University alumni
Academic staff of Hohai University
Members of the Chinese Academy of Engineering
20th-century Chinese engineers
21st-century Chinese engineers
Members of the 10th Chinese People's Political Consultative Conference